This is a list of chicken breeds usually considered to be of Dutch origin. Some may have complex or obscure histories, so inclusion here does not necessarily imply that a breed is predominantly or exclusively from the Netherlands.

References

Chicken